Lodi is a city and comune in Lombardy, northern Italy, primarily on the western bank of the River Adda. It is the capital of the province of Lodi.

History

Lodi was a Celtic village; in Roman times it was called, in Latin, Laus Pompeia (probably in honour of the consul Gnaeus Pompeius Strabo) and was known also because its position allowed many Gauls of Gallia Cisalpina to obtain Roman citizenship. It was in an important position where a vital Roman road crossed the River Adda.

Lodi became the see of a diocese in the 3rd century. Saint Bassianus (San Bassiano) is the patron saint of the town.

A free commune around 1000, it fiercely resisted the Milanese, who destroyed it in 1111. The old town corresponds to the modern Lodi Vecchio. Frederick Barbarossa rebuilt it on its current location in 1158.

From 1220, the Lodigiani (inhabitants of Lodi) spent decades in constructing a system of miles of artificial rivers and channels (called Consorzio di Muzza). It was created to give water to the countryside, turning arid areas into one of the region's important agricultural areas.

From the 14th century Lodi was ruled by the Visconti family, who built a castle  there. In 1413, the antipope John XXIII launched the bull by which he convened the Council of Constance from the Duomo of Lodi. The council marked the end of the Great Schism.

In 1454, representatives from all the regional states of Italy met in Lodi to sign the treaty known as the peace of Lodi, by which they intended to pursue Italian unification. This peace lasted 40 years.

The town was then ruled by the Sforza family, France, Spain and Austria. In 1786 it became the eponymous capital of a province that between 1815 and 1859 would have included Crema.

On 10 May 1796, in the first major battle of his career as a general, the young Napoleon Bonaparte defeated the Austrians aka the 1526-1804 Habsburg monarchy in the Battle of Lodi. In the second half of the 19th century, Lodi began to expand outside the city walls, boosted by economic expansion and the construction of railway lines that followed the unification of Italy.

In 1945, the Italian petrol company Agip, directed by Enrico Mattei, started extracting methane from its fields, and Lodi was the first Italian town with a regular domestic gas service. Today the town is at the heart of important communication routes, and is a technologically advanced industrial centre, maintaining, however, also its strong traditional ceramics tradition.

Main sights

Piazza della Vittoria, listed by the Italian Touring Club among the most beautiful squares in Italy. Featuring porticoes on all its four sides, it includes the Basilica della Vergine Assunta and the Broletto (town hall).
Piazza Broletto, with a Verona marble baptismal font dating to the 14th century.
Beata Vergine Incoronata, church in style of Lombard Renaissance.
San Francesco, a Gothic-style church built in 1280–1307.
San Lorenzo, a church with frescoes by Callisto Piazza.
Santa Maria del Sole, a late Baroque-style Catholic church.
Santa Maria Maddalena, a Baroque church. The original Romanesque structure (1162) was replaced in the 18th century. The interior has frescoes by Carlo Innocenzo Carloni and a Deposition attributed to Robert de Longe.
Sant'Agnese, church in Lombard Gothic style (14th century). It includes the Galliani Polyptych by Albertino Piazza (1520), and has, on the façade, a rose window decorated with polychrome majolica.
San Filippo, Rococo-style church
Palazzo Vescovile (Bishopric Palace), of medieval origin but rebuilt in the 18th century.
San Cristoforo, church designed by Pellegrino Tibaldi.
Visconti Castle (Torrione), a medieval castle now partially destroyed.
Palazzo Mozzanica (15th century)
Palazzo Modignani, 18th-century urban palace
Torre di Lodi, a modern building high 70 meters about. It is located in the Business District, and it is the tallest building in the city. 
Biblioteca Laudense located in Palazzo San Filippo, adjacent to church

Government

Economy
In 1864 Tiziano Zalli founded the Banca Popolare di Lodi, the first Italian cooperative bank (now part of Banco Popolare group).

In 1945, the Italian petrol company Agip, directed by Enrico Mattei, started extracting methane from its fields, and Lodi was the first Italian town with a regular domestic gas service.

In Lodi there is the headquarters of Zucchetti, in Lodi Tower. Zucchetti is a company specialized in Information Technology.

In the city is situated the headquarters of 'Erbolario'.

The Officine Meccaniche Lodigiane were also located in the city. See :it:Lodi.

Culture

Ceramics 

The production of ceramic in the Lodi area reached its artistic peak in the 18th century, with the production of fine, tin-glazed maiolica. The main factories were those of Coppellotti, Ferretti and Rossetti.

The best ceramics of the Coppellotti factory date from the period 1735–1740. Some are in monochromatic turquoise and are decorated with arabesques, draperies and geometric-floral compositions arranged in a radial pattern. Other ceramics represent local life and scenes, such as fruit, fish, landscapes, castles, peasants, wayfarers, music players, with dogs or birds; some represent oriental figures.

The Rossetti factory was active in Lodi between 1729 and 1736. Most of the Rossetti ceramics are in monochromatic turquoise and have decorations inspired by Roman art revisited in a Baroque style, such as pillars, balustrades, capitals, urns, shells, stylized leaves garlands, divinities and satyrs. Some ceramics feature landscapes in the center, with views of cities and castles, hills, lakes, clouds and birds.

The Ferretti factory was active in Lodi in the 18th century until the beginning of the 19th century. 
Ferretti ceramics are famous for the decoration with naturalistic flowers, with very bright and lively colours.  Most frequently these were wild flowers, such as forget-me-not, buttercups, Centaurea cyanus, campanula, primroses and dog rose; but also cultivated roses, tulips and carnations were painted. Ferretti also painted other kind of decorations, such as Oriental figures, fruits, fish and still lifes.

A large exposition of Lodi ceramics could be visited in The Museo Civico di Lodi until its closure in 2011, when all its content was moved to long-term storage waiting for relocation.

Twin towns
 Constance, Germany
 Lodi, California, United States
 Omegna, Italy.
 Fontainebleau, France.

Gallery

References

Sources

Mario-Giuseppe Genesi, Gli Organi Storici del Lodigiano, Piacenza, L.I.R. Editrice, 2017, pp. 720. 
 
 

 
Cities and towns in Lombardy